Mens Sana 1871 Basket history and statistics in FIBA Europe and Euroleague Basketball (company) competitions.

European competitions

External links 
FIBA Europe
Euroleague
ULEB
Eurocup

Basketball in Italy